Peter Wessels (born 7 May 1978) is a presently inactive tour professional male tennis player from the Netherlands. He achieved his career-high singles ranking of world No. 72 in February 2005.

Biography

Wessels had an excellent junior career, finishing No. 5 in singles and No. 18 in doubles in the  1995 world junior rankings. In that year he reached the singles semifinals at Wimbledon and US Open juniors and captured Roland Garros junior doubles title with fellow countryman Raemon Sluiter.

His best result on the professional tour was winning the 2000 ATP tournament in Newport beating German Jens Knippschild in the final 7–6, 6–3.

He started 2006 by qualifying for the Hopman Cup tournament in Perth with Michaëlla Krajicek where the Dutch went all the way to the final only to be beaten in a very close mixed doubles by the American team of Taylor Dent and Lisa Raymond. Despite this, Wessels and Krajicek proved that they were a force to be reckoned with. At the Hopman Cup, he won 4 out of his 5 singles matches (def. Peng Sun, Gastón Gaudio, Todd Reid and Nicolas Kiefer; lost to Taylor Dent). In Mixed Doubles, they had a 3–2 record (def. Reid/Stosur, Peng/Sun, Grönefeld/Kiefer; lost to Raymond/Dent, Dulko/Gaudio).

In June 2007 Wessels qualified for the Ordina Open grass tournament in 's-Hertogenbosch. Ranked 488 he caused an upset in the quarterfinals by beating the number one seeded Spaniard Tommy Robredo, in two sets: 6–3, 6–3. He subsequently reached the final but narrowly lost against Croat Ivan Ljubičić 6–7(5), 6–3, 6–7(4).

ATP career finals

Singles: 2 (1 title, 1 runner-up)

ATP Challenger and ITF Futures finals

Singles: 17 (8-9)

Doubles: 12 (5–7)

Junior Grand Slam finals

Doubles: 2 (1 title, 1 runner-up)

Performance timeline

Singles

External links
 
 
 

1978 births
Living people
Dutch male tennis players
French Open junior champions
Hopman Cup competitors
Tennis players from Amsterdam
Sportspeople from Zwolle
Grand Slam (tennis) champions in boys' doubles